Pishgaman Cycling Team is an Iranian UCI Continental cycling team established in 2014.

Doping

On February 10, 2017, the UCI announced that Rahim Emami had tested positive for an Anabolic Androgenic Steroid during the 2016 Jelajah Malaysia and was provisionally suspended. As teammate Naser Rezavi also tested positive in the Jelajah Malaysia in December 2015, the UCI considers this a second Adverse Analytical Finding in a 12-month period with the team potentially facing a ban of between 15 and 45 days. Emami was handed a seven year and six month ban, expiring on May 24, 2024, when Emami will be 42, therefore the ban will effectively end his professional career.

Team roster

Major wins

2014
 National Road Race Championships, Rahim Emami
Overall Tour de Singkarak, Amir Zargari
Stage 3, Ramin Mehrabani
Stage 4, Rahim Emami
Stage 4 Tour of Iran, Rahim Emami
2015
Asian Road Race Championships, Hossein Askari
Asian Time Trial Championships, Hossein Askari
 National Time Trial Championships, Hossein Askari
Stage 5 Tour of Japan, Rahim Emami
Stage 4 Tour of Iran, Hossein Askari
Overall Tour de Singkarak, Arvin Moazzami
Stage 2, Amir Zargari
Stage 6, Hossein Askari
2016
 National Time Trial Championships, Arvin Moazzami
Stage 4 Tour of Japan, Mohammad Rajablou
Overall Tour de Singkarak, Amir Kolahdouz
Stage 2, Rahim Emami
Stage 4, Amir Kolahdouz
Overall  Jelajah Malaysia, Arvin Moazzami
Stage 1, Rahim Emami
Stage 2, Arvin Moazzami
Overall Tour of Fuzhou, Rahim Emami
Stages 1 & 4, Rahim Emami
2017
Stage 3 Tour de Flores, Arvin Moazzami
Stage 4 Tour of Iran (Azerbaijan), Amir Kolahdouz
Stage 4 International Tour de Banyuwangi Ijen, Arvin Moazzami
Stage 3 International Tour de Banyuwangi Ijen, Amir Kolahdouz
2018
Stage 3 Tour of Mevlana, Mohammad Ganjkhanlou
Stages 1 & 6 Tour of Iran (Azerbaijan), Mohammad Ganjkhanlou

References

External links

UCI Continental Teams (Asia)
Cycling teams established in 2014
Cycling teams based in Iran
2014 establishments in Iran